Prefect is a magisterial title of varying definition, but which, basically, refers to the leader of an administrative area. It may also refer to:

France

Prefect (France), (French: préfet), is the French state's representative in a department or region
Prefecture of Police, (French: Préfecture de police), headed by the Prefect of Police (Préfet de police), is an agency of the Government of France
Maritime Prefect, a servant of the French State who exercises authority over the sea in one particular region (a Préfecture maritime)
Prefect of Saint Pierre and Miquelon, the local representative of the President of France and in effect the Governor or Executive officer of the territory

Ancient Rome

Urban prefect praefectus urbanus or praefectus urbi,  was prefect of the city of Rome, and later also of Constantinople
Praetorian prefect, was the title of a high office in the Roman Empire; originating as the commander of the Praetorian Guard

Church

Apostolic prefect (or prefect apostolic) is a Roman Catholic priest who heads an apostolic prefecture, a missionary area where the Catholic Church is not yet sufficiently developed to have it made a diocese

Other
Prefect (Romania), an official of the national government assigned to each county
Ford Prefect,  line of British cars produced by the UK division of Ford Motor Company 
Ford Prefect (character), character in The Hitchhiker's Guide to the Galaxy
HMS Prefect (Z263), was a net laying ship for the Royal Navy during the Second World
Slingsby Prefect, a 1948 British modernisation of the 1932 single-seat Grunau Baby glider
Grob G 120TP, an aircraft which in British service is called the Prefect.